The Mars monolith is a rectangular object (possibly a boulder) discovered on the surface of Mars. It is located near the bottom of a cliff, from which it likely fell. The Mars Reconnaissance Orbiter took pictures of it from orbit, roughly 180 miles (300 km) away. The HiRISE camera that was used to photograph the monolith has a resolution of approximately 1 foot or 30 centimeters per pixel.

Around the same time, the Phobos monolith made international news.

See also

 List of rocks on Mars 
 Mineralogy of Mars
 Phobos monolith, boulder on Martian moon

References

External links
Boulders and Layers in Canyon - NASA
HRSC - ESA (overview of HiRISE image region by Mars Express)
HiRISE image of area

Rocks on Mars
Natural monoliths